This is a list of the mammal species recorded in San Marino. There are nine mammal species in San Marino, of which one is near threatened.

The following tags are used to highlight each species' conservation status as assessed by the International Union for Conservation of Nature:

Order: Rodentia (rodents) 

Rodents make up the largest order of mammals, with over 40% of mammalian species. They have two incisors in the upper and lower jaw which grow continually and must be kept short by gnawing.
Suborder: Myomorpha
Family: Cricetidae
Subfamily: Arvicolinae
Genus: Myodes
 Bank vole, Myodes glareolus
Family: Muridae (mice, rats, gerbils, etc.)
Subfamily: Murinae
Genus: Apodemus
 Wood mouse, A. sylvaticus LC

Order: Soricomorpha (shrews, moles, and solenodons) 

The "shrew-forms" are insectivorous mammals. The shrews and solenodons closely resemble mice while the moles are stout-bodied burrowers.

Family: Talpidae (moles)
Subfamily: Talpinae
Tribe: TalpiniGenus: Talpa Blind mole, T. caeca 

 Order: Chiroptera (bats) 

The bats' most distinguishing feature is that their forelimbs are developed as wings, making them the only mammals capable of flight. Bat species account for about 20% of all mammals.
Family: Vespertilionidae
Subfamily: Miniopterinae
Genus: MiniopterusCommon bent-wing bat, M. schreibersii 
Family: Rhinolophidae
Subfamily: Rhinolophinae
Genus: RhinolophusGreater horseshoe bat, R. ferrumequinum 
Lesser horseshoe bat, R. hipposideros 

 Order: Carnivora (carnivorans) 

There are over 260 species of carnivorans, the majority of which feed primarily on meat. They have a characteristic skull shape and dentition. 
Suborder: Caniformia
Family: Canidae (dogs, foxes)
Genus: VulpesRed fox, V. vulpes 
Family: Mustelidae (mustelids)
Genus: MustelaLeast weasel, M. nivalis 
Genus: LutraEurasian otter, L. lutra''

See also
List of chordate orders
Lists of mammals by region
List of prehistoric mammals
Mammal classification
List of mammals described in the 2000s

Notes

References
 

San Marino
Mammals
Mammals
San Marino